Senefeldera is a plant genus of the spurge family (Euphorbiaceae). Their wood can be used as timber, in handicraft and as firewood. It is native to Brazil, Colombia, Peru and Venezuela.

The genus was circumscribed by Mart. in Flora vol.24 (2) on page 29 in 1841.

The genus name of Senefeldera is in honour of Johann Alois Senefelder (1771–1834), who was a German actor and playwright who invented the printing technique of lithography in the 1790s.

Species
Kew accepts 3 species;
 Senefeldera testiculata 
 Senefeldera triandra 
 Senefeldera verticillata

References 

Hippomaneae
Euphorbiaceae genera
Flora of Venezuela
Flora of Colombia
Flora of Peru
Flora of Brazil